Allen End is a village in Warwickshire, England. Population details can be found under Sutton Coldfield.

External links

Villages in Warwickshire